National Mourning Day of Bangladesh is celebrated as a national day in Bangladesh. On 15 August of every year, the day is observed with mourning. The black flag is hoisted as well as the national flag is kept at half-mast.

History 

On 15 August 1975, the first president of independent Bangladesh and the "father of the nation" who is also called "Bangabandhu," Sheikh Mujibur Rahman was killed by a group of army personnel, along with his family at his house in Dhanmondi in the Bangladeshi capital Dhaka. Besides him, his wife Bangamata Begum Fazilatunnesa Mujib was killed that day. Besides, 16 more people were killed along with their family members and relatives.

In 1996, Prime Minister Sheikh Hasina, Sheikh Mujibur Rahman's daughter, bypassed her parliament and promulgated the national day of remembrance by decree. The ordinance was later ratified by her parliament in a bill. When the opposition Bangladesh Nationalist Party (BNP) came to power in 2001, they reversed the bill. Awami League (AL) stalwarts continued to observe the anniversary, but without government recognition. In 2008, the caretaker government reintroduced the holiday. Sociologist Hasanuzzaman Chowdhury wrote that Khaleda Zia, leader of the BNP and former prime minister, shifted the observance of her birthday to 15 August to defy the AL and mock the commemoration.

Activities 
The government has made it obligatory for schools and other public institutions to observe the holiday, and granted universities funds to organize events on the day.

Government officials and Awami League supporters commemorate the day by laying wreaths, making speeches, and attending special prayers. Anthropologist Mascha Schultz has described a striking absence of the general public, those not involved in politics or compelled to attend, from commemoration events.

References  

Assassination of Sheikh Mujibur Rahman
Public holidays in Bangladesh
Annual events in Bangladesh
August observances
Observances honoring the dead